Shaykh Muhammad Salih Bengali was an 18th-century Islamic scholar and teacher from Bengal. He is mentioned in the works of Abd al-Hayy al-Lucknawi and Muhammad Ishaq Bhatti, where he is described as one of the leading scholars in the fields of Islamic jurisprudence, its principles, hikmah, kalam and logic.

Biography
Muhammad Salih originated from Bengal, hence the suffix Bengali is found attached to his name in historical literary works. He studied the Islamic sciences under Shihab ad-Din, the Qadi of Gopamau, in Hindustan. After that, he joined the halaqa of Mir Zahid Harawi (d. 1689) who was one of the teachers of Shah Abdur Rahim that was serving as a Qadi at the Mughal imperial court. He benefitted a lot from this teacher. Thereafter, Salih became a teacher of Islamic studies himself. Among his many students was Qutb ad-Din, the son of his former teacher Shihab ad-Din, who also became a Qadi. Qutb ad-Din traced (isnad) the works of Zahid Harawi from Muhammad Salih, and was the teacher of Majduddin.

References

18th-century Bengalis
Bengali Muslim scholars of Islam
18th-century Indian Muslims
Indian Sunni Muslims
18th-century Muslim theologians
17th-century births
18th-century deaths
Year of birth unknown
Year of death unknown